This is a list of Russian rail accidents.

1882 
 13 July – Tcherny railway accident:  a train was derailed near Tcherny, and more than 40 people killed.

1888 

 29 October – Borki train disaster: An imperial train carrying Alexander III derailed. 23 killed.

1905 
 October 6: At Rostov, a derailment of the mail train to Vladivostok killed 27 people and injured 35.

1917 
 August 13: A passenger train and a "luggage train" collide on the line from Moscow to Petrograd (now Saint Petersburg), killing 60 people and injuring 150.
 November 2: At Vladikavkaz, an express passenger train and a military train collide head-on, killing 25 people (mostly soldiers) and severely injuring 70.

1920 
 October 1920: At Pogranichny, Primorsky Krai, the mail train from Vladivostok to Harbin, China wrecks killing about 100.

1921 
 January: On a mixed train from Novgorod, a consignment of flammable liquid  explodes at Luga,  killing 68 people.

1923 
 September 8: An express train derails at Omsk killing 82 and injuring 150.

1924 
 October: On the line from Moscow to Ivanovo and Vasenensk,  a mixed train carrying passengers and gasoline is destroyed by fire. It was said that of 200 people on board only 27 survived, but the Soviet authorities suppressed the story.

1929 
 September 23: A train from Moscow to Siberia derails at Zuyevka,  between Kursk and Kharkiv (now in Ukraine); at least 30 were killed.

1930 
 April 16: At Domodedovo, some denatured alcohol spilled in a train is accidentally ignited. The fire results in the deaths of 45 people and seriously injures 23.
 May 20: At Chernaya  on the Moscow-Kazan line, the collision of a passenger and a freight train results in the deaths of 28 and severely injures 29.
 June 29: A train from Irkutsk to Leningrad (now St. Petersburg) is derailed near its destination due to a signalman's error; 22 die and 28 are seriously injured.

1931 
 September: A troop train southwest of Leningrad explodes with heavy loss of life.

1932 
 January 2: At Kosino,  just outside Moscow, a train moving at  hits the rear of a stopped suburban train. Although there is time, nobody acts to protect the wreckage and a train of empty freight wagons crashes into it. Altogether 68 people are killed and 130 injured, and 11 railwaymen are arrested for criminal negligence.
 October 18: The Black Sea express train, coming from Sochi, struck a freight car that had been mistakenly switched to the express tracks at Lublinov station, eleven kilometers from Moscow, telescoping five cars, three of them passenger coaches. Casualties include 36 killed and 51 injured. On October 31, the Soviet government sentenced to death the station master whose negligence caused the accident. Three others also sharing responsibility received prison terms.

1934 
 March 4: At a station  from Moscow, a stationary train is struck by another one, killing 19 and injuring 52. The enginemen of the second train are sentenced to death and three other railwaymen to prison.
 March 12: At Tavatuy, northwest of Sverdlovsk (now Yekaterinburg), a passenger train runs past signals and crashes into a freight; 33 are killed and 68 injured.

1935 
 January 6: At Porbelo  on the railway from Leningrad to Moscow, an express from Leningrad to Tiflis (now Tbilisi, Georgia) is stopped by a broken rail. The following train, an express to Moscow, runs past signals and crashes into it, killing 23 and badly injuring 56. Seven railwaymen are convicted of criminal negligence.

1936 
 June 22: At Karymskoye, a train is allowed to set out while the track ahead is occupied. The rear-end collision kills 51 people and injures 52; the stationmaster is sentenced to death and eight other people to prison.

1962 
 May 10: Two crowded commuter trains collided on National Railway Day while one of them was stopped at a junction in the north part of Moscow. Foreign newspapermen and diplomats living nearby reported seeing scores of ambulances, but Soviet authorities imposed a cover-up.

1987 
 7 August – Kamensk-Shakhtinsky rail disaster: A freight train collided with standing passenger train in Kamenskaya station, Kamensk-Shakhtinsky, Rostov Oblast, killing 106.

1988 
 4 June – Arzamas train disaster: Three goods wagons carrying a total of 118 tons of hexogen (RDX) exploded on a railway crossing in Arzamas, Gorky Oblast (now Nizhny Novgorod Oblast), 91 killed and 1500 injured.
 16 August – Bologoye derailment occurred on the express train Avrora, 31 killed.

1989 
 4 June – Ufa train wreck: Natural gas leaking from a pipeline is ignited by wheel sparks from two trains traveling near the site of the leak; the resulting explosion killed 575 and injured 700 in one of the worst railway accidents in Soviet and Russian history.

1992 
 3 March – Podsosenka train disaster: A passenger train inbound from Riga to Moscow failed to stop at a red signal and collided with an oncoming freight train at Podsosenka station near Nelidovo, Tver Oblast; the collision started a fire which spread to the passenger cars; 43 people killed and 108 injured.

1996 
 26 September – A collision between a diesel locomotive and a school bus between Bataysk and Salsk in Rostov Oblast. 19 killed, including 18 children. 28 September was declared a national day of mourning.

2001 
 November 8: A nuclear waste train from Bulgaria crashes at midnight between Krasnoyarsk and Kemerovo on the Trans-Siberian Railway. 14 of the 20 tanker-wagons derail and the line is closed for about 12 hours. One kilometre of track is damaged.

2005 
The crash was blamed on poor track maintenance.

2006 
 12 January – A collision between a bus and a train at an unpatrolled railway level crossing in Krasnodar killed 22 people and badly injured another 6. All the victims were workers at a factory on their way home aboard the bus, which was almost unrecognisable after the crash. The train's engine car derailed but no-one on the train was hurt.
 18 September – A collision between stations Ikorets and Bityug (Voronezh Oblast), between freight train 3040 moving backward without control with train 2104, stopped at red signal behind. 43 freight cars fully damaged. No one was hurt.

2013 
 7 July: At least 75 are injured in a train from Novosibirsk to Sochi when it derails between Krylovskaya and Kislyakovka in Krasnodar Krai.

2014 
 20 May – Naro-Fominsk rail crash: A Moldovan Railways passenger train crashed into a Ukrainian Railways freight train that had derailed near Nara station in Naro-Fominsk, killing nine and injuring 51.
 15 July – 2014 Moscow Metro derailment: An outbound train derailed due to a weathered track, killing 24, and injuring 160, while travelling between Park Pobedy and Slavyansky Bulvar stations of the Arbatsko-Pokrovskaya Line.

2015 
 8 August: Four railcars of Passenger train number 233 en route from Yekaterinburg to Adler, Krasnodar Krai run off the rails in Mordovia. Five passengers are injured.

2017 
 8 April: Two passenger trains collide in Moscow, injuring about 50 people.
 6 October: A train hits a bus carrying Uzbekistani passengers in Vladimir Oblast and kills 16 people.
 25 December: In Moscow, a bus skidded on ice making it crash into a train station which caused trains to delay, 4 people were killed and many people were injured.

2021 
 20 February: In Skovorodinsky, Amur Oblast, 25 cars of a coal train derail on the Trans-Baikal Railway. There were no injuries.

See also 
Lists of rail accidents
List of rail accidents by country

References

 
Russian rail accidents
Accidents
rail